Tatyana Borisovna Yumasheva (formerly Dyachenko, Дьяченко, née Yeltsina, Ельцина; born 17 January 1960) is the younger daughter of former Russian President Boris Yeltsin and Naina Yeltsina. Since 2009, Yumasheva has been a citizen of Austria.

Early life and education
She graduated from MSU Faculty of Computational Mathematics and Cybernetics in 1983. She then worked at the Salyut Design Bureau and later at Khrunichev State Research and Production Space Center until 1994.

Career
Yeltsin made her his personal advisor in 1996 when his re-election campaign was faltering. A memoir written by Yeltsin, as reported by The New York Times, credited her with advising against "banning Communist Party, dissolving Parliament and postponing presidential elections" in 1996. She was particularly influential as Yeltsin recovered from heart surgery in late 1996. She became the keystone in a small group of advisors known as "The Family", although the others (Alexander Voloshin and Valentin Yumashev) were not Yeltsin relatives. Boris Berezovsky and other oligarchs were often included in the group as well.

In 2000, her name came up during a corruption investigation, but no charges were brought. She remained on the staff of Yeltsin's hand-picked successor Vladimir Putin, and was a key adviser to him during his 2000 election campaign, but Putin dismissed her later that year.

She is portrayed in the 2003 satirical comedy Spinning Boris, based on the real experiences of U.S. political consultants in the 1996 campaign.

She and Yumashev provided editorial assistance in preparing the last volume of her father's memoirs, Midnight Diaries.

On 25 February 2022, Yumasheva criticised the 2022 Russian invasion of Ukraine.

Personal life
In 1980, Yeltsina married fellow Moscow State University student, Vilen Ayratovich Khairullin. In 1981, they had a son, Boris. They divorced in 1982. 

In 1987, she married Leonid Yuryevich Dyachenko (known as Alexei), a businessman, designer from Salyut Design Bureau , billionaire, and executive director of Urals Energy, a company under investigation by the Putin government as of 2008.  In 1995, they had a son, Gleb, before divorcing in 2001. 

In 2001, Tatyana married her fellow presidential adviser Valentin Yumashev, and flew to London to have a baby, daughter Maria. Until 2018, Yumashev was the father-in-law of oligarch Oleg Deripaska. 

Tatyana is a close friend of another multi-billionaire, Roman Abramovich.

Along with her husband and their daughter, she has been a citizen of Austria since 2009.

Awards
 Commendation of the President of the Russian Federation for active participation in the organization of the presidential election campaign (1996)

See also
List of Russians

References

External links

1960 births
Living people
Russian women in politics
Children of national leaders
Family of Boris Yeltsin
Moscow State University alumni
Naturalised citizens of Austria
Russian activists against the 2022 Russian invasion of Ukraine
Children of national leaders of Russia